The Faroe Insurance Company (TF), often referred to as Tryggingin, is an insurance company in the Faroe Islands. The company currently employs about 110 people and is headquartered in Tórshavn. The Faroe Insurance Company also has branch offices in Sandavágur, Saltangará, Klaksvík, and Tvøroyri. The company was founded as Tryggingarsambandið Føroyar (the Faroese Insurance Union) in 1965 and received its current name in 1998. Chairmen of the company have included Kristian Djurhuus, Johan Poulsen, and Hilmar Kass.

References

External links
 The Faroe Insurance Company (English homepage)

Financial services companies established in 1965
Insurance companies of the Faroe Islands
1965 establishments in Europe
1965 in the Faroe Islands